Within cluster and parallel computing, a cluster manager is usually backend graphical user interface (GUI) or command-line interface (CLI) software that runs on a set of cluster nodes that it manages (in some cases it runs on a different server or cluster of management servers). The cluster manager works together with a cluster management agent. These agents run on each node of the cluster to manage and configure services, a set of services, or to manage and configure the complete cluster server itself (see super computing.) In some cases the cluster manager is mostly used to dispatch work for the cluster (or cloud) to perform. In this last case a subset of the cluster manager can be a remote desktop application that is used not for configuration but just to send work and get back work results from a cluster. In other cases the cluster is more related to availability and load balancing than to computational or specific service clusters.

See also
 List of cluster management software
 Grid network

Further reading

Cluster management
 Adaptive Control of Extreme-scale Stream Processing Systems Proceedings of the 26th IEEE International Conference on Distributed Computing Systems.
 Design, implementation, and evaluation of the linear road benchmark on the stream processing core Proceedings of the 2006 ACM SIGMOD international conference on Management of data.
 Parallel Job Scheduling A Status Report (2004) 10th Workshop on Job Scheduling Strategies for Parallel Processing, New-York, NY, June 2004.
 Condor-G: A Computation Management Agent for Multi-Institutional Grids Springer Journal Cluster Computing Volume 5, Number 3 / July, 2002
 From clusters to the fabric: the job management perspective Cluster Computing, 2003. Proceedings. 2003 IEEE International Conference on
 An Overview of the Galaxy Management Framework for Scalable Enterprise Cluster Computing IEEE International Conference on Cluster Computing (Cluster'00),  2000.
 Performance and Interoperability Issues in Incorporating Cluster Management Systems within a Wide-Area Network-Computing Environment ACM/IEEE Supercomputing 2000: High Performance Networking and Computing.
 DIRAC: a scalable lightweight architecture for high throughput computing Grid Computing, 2004. Proceedings. Fifth IEEE/ACM International Workshop on
 AgentTeamwork: Coordinating grid-computing jobs with mobile agents Springer Journal Applied Intelligence Volume 25, Number 2 / October, 2006
 Mesos: A Platform for Fine-Grained Resource Sharing in the Data Center UC Berkeley Tech Report, May, 2010

Autonomic computing
 The Laundromat Model for Autonomic Cluster Computing Autonomic Computing, 2006. ICAC '06. IEEE International Conference on.
 Distributed Stream Management using Utility-Driven Self-Adaptive Middleware Proceedings of the Second International Conference on Automatic Computing (2005).

Fault tolerance
 Fault-tolerance in the Borealis distributed stream processing system Proceedings of the 2005 ACM SIGMOD international conference on Management of data.
 A Global-State-Triggered Fault Injector for Distributed System Evaluation IEEE Transactions On Parallel And Distributed Systems / July, 2004
 Job-Site Level Fault Tolerance for Cluster and Grid environments IEEE International Conference on Cluster Computing (Cluster 2005)
 Fault Injection in Distributed Java Applications Parallel and Distributed Processing Symposium, 2006. IPDPS 2006. 20th International
 Load balancing and fault tolerance in workstation clusters migrating groups of communicating processes ACM SIGOPS Operating Systems Review, October 1995.

Background
 A Short Survey of Commercial Cluster Batch Schedulers

Parallel computing
Cluster computing